The Adoration of the Magi is a subject in Christian art.

Adoration of the Magi may also refer to:

 Adoration of the Magi (Andrea della Robbia)
 Adoration of the Magi (Artemisia Gentileschi)
 Adoration of the Magi (Biscaino)
 Adoration of the Magi (Bosch, Madrid)
 Adoration of the Magi (Bosch, New York)
 Adoration of the Magi (Bosch, Philadelphia)
 Adoration of the Magi (Botticelli, 1475)
 Adoration of the Magi (Castello)
 Adoration of the Magi (Cesare da Sesto)
 Adoration of the Magi (Correggio)
 Adoration of the Magi (Dürer)
 Adoration of the Magi (El Greco)
 Adoration of the Magi (Filippino Lippi)
 Adoration of the Magi (Fra Angelico and Filippo Lippi)
 Adoration of the Magi (Garofalo)
 Adoration of the Magi (Geertgen tot Sint Jans)
 Adoration of the Magi (Gentile da Fabriano)
 Adoration of the Magi (Gothic boxwood altarpiece), attributed to the workshop of Adam Dircksz.
 Adoration of the Magi (Jacob van Oostsanen)
 Adoration of the Magi (Leonardo)
 Adoration of the Magi (Lorenzo Monaco)
 Adoration of the Magi (Mantegna)
 Adoration of the Magi (Memling)
 Adoration of the Magi (Mostaert)
 Adoration of the Magi (Ospedale degli Innocenti)
 Adoration of the Magi (Parmigianino)
 Adoration of the Magi (Perugino, Città della Pieve)
 Adoration of the Magi (Perugino, Perugia)
 Adoration of the Magi (Perugino, Trevi)
 Adoration of the Magi (Pontormo)
 Adoration of the Magi (Rembrandt)
 Adoration of the Magi (Rubens, Antwerp)
 Adoration of the Magi (Rubens, Cambridge)
 Adoration of the Magi (Rubens, Lyon)
 Adoration of the Magi (Rubens, Madrid)
 Adoration of the Magi (Salomon Koninck)
 Adoration of the Magi (Sequeira)
 Adoration of the Magi (Signorelli)
 Adoration of the Magi (Stefano da Verona)
 Adoration of the Magi (Stom)
 Adoration of the Magi (tapestry) by Morris & Co.; see also Star of Bethlehem (painting)
 Adoration of the Magi (Velázquez)
 Adoration of the Magi (Veronese)
 Adoration of the Magi in a Winter Landscape by Pieter Bruegel the Elder
 Adoration of the Kings (Bramantino)
 Adoration of the Kings (Bruegel)
 Adoration of the Kings (Damaskinos)
 Adoration of the Kings (David, London)
 Adoration of the Kings (Gossaert)
 Dombild Altarpiece by Stefan Lochner
 Monforte Altarpiece by Hugo van der Goes